Hogback may refer to:

Grand Hogback, geological formation in Northwestern Colorado
Hogback (sculpture), Anglo-Scandinavian stone tomb markers found in the UK
Hogback (geology), one of a number of topographic features (landforms) created by the erosion of tilted strata
Hogback Hills, a recreation area straddling Genesee County and Lapeer County, Michigan
 Hogback Mountain (disambiguation), the name of many mountains in the United States and Canada
 Hogback (New York), a summit in Schoharie County, New York
 Hogback Ridge, a summit in Alaska
 Hogback Ridge, an early name for Mount Oread, Kansas
 Doctor Hogback, a character in the anime and manga One Piece, who lives on Thriller Bark

See also
Hogs Back (disambiguation), including uses of Hogsback